Doab-e Zali (also Romanized as Doāb-e Zālī and Do Āb Zālī; also known as Zālī Do Āb and Zālī-ye Dowāb) is a village in Nurali Rural District, in the Central District of Delfan County, Lorestan Province, Iran. At the 2006 census, its population was 275, in 50 families.

References 

Towns and villages in Delfan County